Jorge Flores (born in La Piedad, Mexico on 31 January 1954) is a Mexican, who was on the 1976 Summer Olympics Mexico national basketball team. He currently resides in East Liverpool, Ohio.

External links
Jorge Flores at basketball-reference.com

1954 births
Living people
Mexican men's basketball players
Basketball players at the 1976 Summer Olympics
Olympic basketball players of Mexico
People from La Piedad
Basketball players from Michoacán
People from East Liverpool, Ohio